The University of Nebraska Medical Center College of Dentistry is located on the East Campus of the University of Nebraska–Lincoln. The College offers degrees in Doctor of Dental Surgery (DDS) and Registered Dental Hygienist (RDH). The College also offers postgraduate programs for Endodontics, Orthodontics, Pediatrics, Periodontics and General Practice Residency. The Department of Oral Biology participates in the Medical Sciences Interdepartmental Area (MSIA) Program in the Graduate College at the University of Nebraska Medical Center (UNMC). Master of Science and Doctor of Philosophy degrees are offered with specialization in a variety of biomedical disciplines.

See also

American Student Dental Association

References

Dental schools in Nebraska
University of Nebraska–Lincoln
Education in Lincoln, Nebraska
Educational institutions established in 1881
1881 establishments in Nebraska